Humanist may refer to:

 A proponent or practitioner of humanism, which has several distinct senses, which are listed at:
 Humanism (disambiguation)
 A Renaissance Humanist or scholar in the Renaissance
 Humanist, a typeface class under the Vox-ATypI classification, which may refer to:
 Humanist sans-serif typefaces
 Humanist or old-style serif typefaces
 Humanist (electronic seminar), an email discussion list on humanities computing, described as “an international online seminar on humanities computing and the digital humanities”
 The Humanist (journal), a magazine published by the American Humanist Association
 Humanist (journal), a magazine published by the Norwegian Humanist Association
 A scholar or academic in the Humanities
Humanism (philosophy of education)
 Humanistic (album), the 2001 debut album by Abandoned Pools
 Humanist minuscule, a style of handwriting invented in 15th century Italy
 Humanist Movement, international volunteer organisation linked to Silo (Mario Rodriguez Cobos), sometimes referred to as New Humanism

See also
Centre démocrate humaniste, also known as The Humanist Democratic Centre	
Humanist International, consortium of Humanist Movement's political parties
Humanistic Judaism
Humanist Manifesto
Humanistic psychology